Langhorne Slim is the third studio album by the New York-based folk singer Langhorne Slim and is the first album released under the Kemado recording label, released in 2008.

Track listing
"Spinning Compass" – 1:54
"Rebel Side of Heaven" – 2:33
"Restless" – 2:17
"Sometimes"  – 3:06
"She's Gone" – 3:19
"Colette" – 3:47
"Hello Sunshine" – 2:27
"Diamonds and Gold" – 3:40
"The Honeymoon"  – 2:03
"The Tipping Point"  – 2:07
"Oh Honey"  – 1:47
"Worries" – 2:51
"Hummingbird" – 4:07

Personnel

Band Members
Langhorne Slim - Vocals, Guitars, Keyboards
Malachi DeLorenzo - Percussion, Vocals,  Producer, Engineer, Mixing
Paul DeFiglia - Basses, Strings, Vocals

Other Crew 
Brian Deck - Producer, Engineer, Mixing, Effects
Jacquire King - Mixing
Jim Becker - Violin 
Sam Kassirer - Kerboards, Percussion, Producer, Engineer, Mixing
Keith Abrahamsson - A&R
Dan Nosheny - Trombone, Tuba

2008 albums
Langhorne Slim albums